The rank–nullity theorem is a theorem in linear algebra, which asserts that the dimension of the domain of a linear map is the sum of its rank (the dimension of its image) and its nullity (the dimension of its kernel).

Stating the theorem

Let  be a linear transformation between two vector spaces where 's domain  is finite dimensional. Then

where

In other words,

This theorem can be refined via the splitting lemma to be a statement about an isomorphism of spaces, not just dimensions.

Matrices 

Since  one can represent linear maps as matrices. In the case of an  matrix, the dimension of the domain is  the number of columns in the matrix. Thus the rank–nullity theorem for a given matrix  immediately becomes

Proofs 
Here we provide two proofs. The first operates in the general case, using linear maps.

While the theorem requires that the domain of the linear map be finite-dimensional, there is no such assumption on the codomain. This means that there are linear maps not given by matrices for which the theorem applies. Despite this, the first proof is not actually more general than the second: since the image of the linear map is finite-dimensional, we can represent the map from its domain to its image by a matrix, prove the theorem for that matrix, then compose with the inclusion of the image into the full codomain.

First proof

As  is a subspace, there exists a basis for it. Suppose  and let

be such a basis.

Let

such that

From this, we know that

Suppose  is not linearly independent, and let

This is a contradiction to  being a basis, unless all  are equal to zero.

Finally we may state that

This concludes our proof.

Second proof

Let  with  linearly independent columns (i.e. ). We will show that:

So, we can write

where
 with  linearly independent column vectors, and

Let

where  is the  identity matrix. We note that  satisfies

For this, let

be any vector such that .

Therefore,

This concludes our proof.

Reformulations and generalizations 
This theorem is a statement of the first isomorphism theorem of algebra for the case of vector spaces; it generalizes to the splitting lemma.

In more modern language, the theorem can also be phrased as saying that each short exact sequence of vector spaces splits. Explicitly, given that

is a short exact sequence of vector spaces, then , hence

Here R plays the role of im T and U is ker T, i.e.

In the finite-dimensional case, this formulation is susceptible to a generalization: if

is an exact sequence of finite-dimensional vector spaces, then

The rank–nullity theorem for finite-dimensional vector spaces may also be formulated in terms of the index of a linear map.

The rank–nullity theorem for finite-dimensional vector spaces is equivalent to the statement

We see that we can easily read off the index of the linear map  from the involved spaces, without any need to analyze  in detail. This effect also occurs in a much deeper result: the Atiyah–Singer index theorem states that the index of certain differential operators can be read off the geometry of the involved spaces.

Citations

References 
 

 
.

Theorems in linear algebra
Isomorphism theorems
Articles containing proofs